Pomerol is a commune in the Gironde department in Nouvelle-Aquitaine near Bordeaux in southwestern France.

Wine

With only . Pomerol is the smallest wine producing area in the Bordeaux region. It is more a community where the vineyards are family-shared. The mostly small-sized producers in the area produce red wines. As in the neighbouring appellation of Saint-Émilion, the predominant grape variety is Merlot, often with Cabernet Franc and smaller quantities of Cabernet Sauvignon. Unlike other Bordeaux regions, Pomerol has no official wine ranking or classification. However, wines like Château Pétrus and Château Le Pin are priced as high as the classified first growths of the Pauillac and Saint-Émilion such as Château Ausone and Château Cheval Blanc.

The next-door and slightly larger "satellite" appellation of Lalande-de-Pomerol produces similar wines which are shorter-lived and less expensive.

Population

See also
French wine
Bordeaux wine
Plan Bordeaux
Communes of the Gironde department

References

External links 

 Pomerol wine information

Communes of Gironde